The 1882 Amherst football team represented the Amherst College during the 1882 college football season.

Schedule

References

Amherst
Amherst Mammoths football seasons
Amherst football